Toula Drimonis is a Canadian journalist and author of the 2022 book We, the Others.

Early life 

Drimonis was born to a parents who emigrated from Greece to Quebec in the 1960s.

Career 
Drimonis is a journalist and social commentator. She is the author of We, the Others which was described in The Halifax Examiner as "part memoir, part history, part manifesto". The book is about the political discourse in Canada around immigration. The book was released in September 2022.

Personal life 
Drimonis lives in Montreal.

References

External links 

 Toula Drimonis - Twitter

Year of birth missing (living people)
Living people
Journalists from Montreal
Writers from Montreal
21st-century Canadian women writers